123 may refer to:
 The first three positive Arabic numerals
 123 (number), the natural number following 122 and preceding 124
 AD 123, a year of the Julian calendar, in the second century AD
 123 BC, a year of the pre-Julian Roman calendar

Entertainment
 123 (film), a 2002 Indian romantic comedy
 123, 2016 Philippines film by Carlo Obispo at 12th Cinemalaya Independent Film Festival
 "123" (Nikki Laoye song), 2012
 "123", a song by Jess Glynne from the 2018 album Always in Between
 "123", a song by Smokepurpp and Murda Beatz from the 2018 album Bless Yo Trap

Other
 123 (file format), used by the Lotus 1-2-3 spreadsheet program
 IRT Seventh Avenue Line, served by the 1, 2, 3 New York Subway services
 123 (interbank network), a shared cash network in Egypt
 Japan Airlines Flight 123, which crashed in 1985 near Tokyo

See also
 1-2-3 (disambiguation)
 12/3 (disambiguation)
 A123 (disambiguation)
 The Taking of Pelham One Two Three (disambiguation)
 Unbitrium, a hypothetical chemical element with atomic number 123